The 2016 Open 13 Provence was a men's tennis tournament played on indoor hard courts. It was the 23rd edition of the Open 13, and part of the ATP World Tour 250 series of the 2016 ATP World Tour. It took place at the Palais des Sports in Marseille, France, from 15 February through 21 February 2016. Unseeded Nick Kyrgios won the singles title.

Points and prize money

Point distribution

Prize money

Singles main-draw entrants

Seeds 

 Rankings are as of February 8, 2016.

Other entrants 
The following players received wildcards into the main draw:
 Quentin Halys
 Ramkumar Ramanathan
 Alexander Zverev

The following players received entry from the qualifying draw:
 Julien Benneteau
 Kenny de Schepper
 Vincent Millot
 Mischa Zverev

The following players received entry as a lucky loser:
 David Guez

Withdrawals 
Before the tournament
 Borna Ćorić →replaced by  Nicolas Mahut
 Jerzy Janowicz →replaced by  Lucas Pouille
 Gaël Monfils(late withdrawal) (right leg injury)→replaced by  David Guez

Retirements 
 Mischa Zverev (neck injury)

Doubles main-draw entrants

Seeds 

1 Rankings are as of February 8, 2016.

Other entrants 
The following pairs received wildcards into the main draw:
 Julien Benneteau /  Édouard Roger-Vasselin
 Hsieh Cheng-peng /  Yi Chu-huan

The following pair received entry as alternates:
 David Guez /  Benoît Paire

Withdrawals 
Before the tournament
 Julien Benneteau (right leg injury)
During the tournament
 Lucas Pouille (bronchitis)

Finals

Singles 

  Nick Kyrgios defeated  Marin Čilić 6–2, 7–6(7–3)

Doubles 

  Mate Pavić /  Michael Venus defeated  Jonathan Erlich /  Colin Fleming 6–2, 6–3

References

External links 
Official website

Open 13 Provence
Open 13